= Elle atTV =

2010–2012 South Korean television channel

ELLE atTV
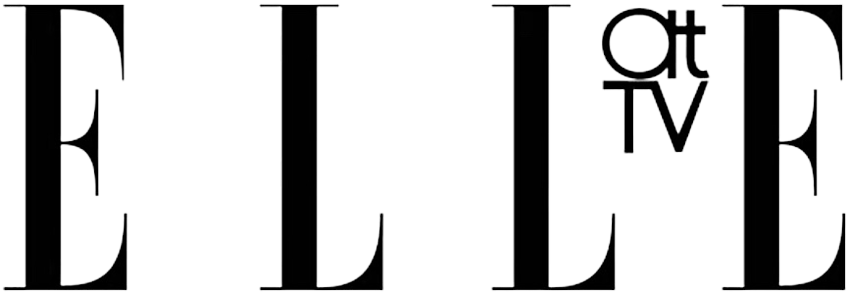
- Type: Defunct broadcast television channel
- Country: South Korea

Programming
- Picture format: 1080i HDTV

Ownership
- Owner: HEM Korea
- Parent: Elle TV Korea Co., Ltd

History
- Launched: January 2010; 15 years ago
- Closed: May 11, 2012

Links
- Website: elleattv.com

ELLE atTV was a South Korean fashion Pay television channel launched in January 2010 by HEM Korea, the publisher of Elle Korea, which covered fashion, art and culture and targeted young women in their 20s and 30s who are interested in love, marriage and career success. It ceased operations on May 11, 2012.
